Qareh Gowzlu (also Romanized as Qareh Gowzlū) is a village in Vargahan Rural District, in the Central District of Ahar County, East Azerbaijan Province, Iran. At the 2006 census, its population was 15, in 5 families.

References 

Populated places in Ahar County